West Calder railway station is a railway station serving West Calder in West Lothian, Scotland. The station has two platforms, connected by a stairway footbridge, and CCTV. It is managed by ScotRail.
In 2018, accessibility improvements at the station saw the installation of a new footbridge and lifts while the original cast iron footbridge was dismantled and removed to the heritage  Bo'ness and Kinneil Railway. Pedestrian ingress onto and egress from either platform, without using stairs or lifts, is possible via tarmac ramp connecting to the pavement of a traffic bridge.

Services 

Since the December 2009 timetable change, the station is currently served, Monday to Saturday, by one ScotRail all-stops service each hour between Glasgow Central and Edinburgh Waverley. There is also a semi-fast service between the two cities each hour which calls (this otherwise stops only at Haymarket,  and ).

The timetable featured a limited Sunday service of one train every two hours from this station to Edinburgh until December 2012; at the timetable change that year a two-hourly Sunday service between Glasgow Central and Edinburgh Waverley was introduced which remains in operation as of May 2016.

As of April 2019, the passenger traction on this line is the Class 380 and Class 385 (previously Class 156 and Class 158).

References

Notes

Sources

External links 
3D model of West Calder Railway station

Railway stations in West Lothian
Railway stations served by ScotRail
Railway stations in Great Britain opened in 1869
Former Caledonian Railway stations
1869 establishments in Scotland
Listed railway stations in Scotland
Category B listed buildings in West Lothian